Tim Burton Productions is an American film and television production company, founded by Tim Burton in the late 1980s. Denise Di Novi once headed the banner from 1989 to 1996. The company was not usually credited on films directed or produced by Burton.

Filmography

Films

Television

Notes

References 

Film production companies of the United States
Entertainment companies based in California
American companies established in 1989